The liking gap is the disparity between how much a person believes that another person likes them, and that other person's actual opinion. Studies have found that most people underestimate how much other people like them and enjoy their company.

Theories for why the gap exists

This misunderstanding or gap has multiple factors that lead to or contribute to it. First, people tend to be overly self-critical and ruminate more on what they have said. In turn people tend to not think too much about what the other person said. People are often very self-absorbed and think that everyone is judging them. An example of this is the spotlight effect. The spotlight effect is when people think everyone is looking and judging them more than they are. Another example is the illusion of transparency, which refers to people's tendency to think that everyone knows exactly what they are thinking when in reality they do not. Second, in conversations people tend to be as polite as possible, especially in first encounters. This politeness is a kind of façade people use which can cause people to misunderstand how much the other person likes them. Third, people tend to protect against rejection. One way of doing this is to not show interest in someone. Fourth, conversations are often quite complex, and people miss both verbal and nonverbal cues. An example of this is when someone is thinking about what they want to say next and ignore what the person just said to them.

Empirical research

Various studies and replications have examined the liking gap and provide validity for the occurrence of this phenomenon. The liking gap is a newer idea and requires more research in order for it to be more widely accepted. Although no specific all-encompassing factor can explain why it happens, it does seems to appear in many interactions.  

The study which first investigated the liking gap looked at people's interactions in various scenarios: strangers meeting for the first time in a laboratory setting, first-year college students getting to know their dorm mates, members of the general public getting to know each other during a personal development workshop. This study was statistically significant and people tended to underestimate how much their conversation partners liked and enjoyed their company. The gap was also seen in the year-long section of the study looking at dorm mates. The dorm mates participated in multiple tests over the year and the gap consistently appeared. It was reliably shown that people's views of their own conversation tended to be more negative than their view of other people's performance. In another study, videos of first encounters were judged based on verbal or nonverbal cues of enjoyment. Even when cues were obvious to outside observers, the gap persisted with the participants. It was also evident in conversations of varying lengths; conversations that were short, medium, and long were compared and the gap appeared in all categories of conversation length. 

There is evidence that suggests the liking gap begins to develop from the age of 5, as this is around the time when children begin to become more aware of and concerned with the ways that they are evaluated by others.

The gap does not show that people are always negative. Research suggests that people usually have favorable views about themselves and others. However, there is evidence that people tend to exhibit self-criticism when thinking about their own interactions with others.

References 

Psychological concepts
Social psychology